Thaub or Thawb (officially, Kharāb ath Thawb, also Romanized as H̱arâb et-Taub) is a city in Yemen.

References

Populated places in 'Amran Governorate